The Lebanese Mission (also known as Châtelaine du Liban, La) is a 1956 French thriller film directed by Richard Pottier and starring Jean-Claude Pascal, Gianna Maria Canale, Jean Servais and Luciana Paluzzi. Omar Sharif also appeared in one of his earlier film roles. The film starts with two scientists launching an expedition exploring for uranium out in the Arabian desert, but they soon find themselves entangled in a web of espionage.

See also
 The Lady of Lebanon, a 1926 film based on the same novel
 The Lady of Lebanon, a 1934 film based on the same novel

References

External links
 
 

1956 films
Italian adventure thriller films
1950s adventure thriller films
1950s French-language films
Films based on works by Pierre Benoit
Films directed by Richard Pottier
French adventure thriller films
Films set in Lebanon
Films based on French novels
1950s French films
1950s Italian films